The 41st Saturn Awards, honoring the best in science fiction, fantasy, horror and other genres in film and television in 2014, was held on June 25, 2015, in Burbank, California. The awards were presented by the Academy of Science Fiction, Fantasy and Horror Films. The nominations were announced in March 2015.

In film, Captain America: The Winter Soldier and Interstellar both led the nominations with eleven, followed by Guardians of the Galaxy with nine. In series, Hannibal and The Walking Dead both earned seven nominations (including a nomination in a Home Entertainment category for Hannibal).

Four persons received two nominations: James Gunn stands as the only nominated in different categories with both Best Director and Best Writing for Guardians of the Galaxy, while Peter King received two Best Make-up nominations, and Joe Letteri and Jonathan Fawkner were both nominated twice in the Best Special Effects category. Additionally, Tom Cruise broke his own record of the most Best Actor nominations by receiving a tenth nomination in the category for Edge of Tomorrow.

Interstellar won the most awards with six wins, including Best Science Fiction Film, Best Writing and Best Music, followed by Guardians of the Galaxy with four wins including Best Comic-to-Film Motion Picture, Best Director and Best Actor. Hannibal and The Walking Dead led the wins in television with three for each, including a tie between the two in the Best Actor category.

Winners and nominees

Film

Television

Programs
{| class=wikitable
|-
! style="background:#EEDD82; width:50%" |Best Network Television Series
! style="background:#EEDD82; width:50%" |Best Syndicated/Cable Television Series
|-
| valign="top" |
 Hannibal (NBC) The Blacklist (NBC)
 The Following (Fox)
 Grimm (NBC)
 Person of Interest (CBS)
 Sleepy Hollow (Fox)
| valign="top" |
 The Walking Dead (AMC) American Horror Story: Freak Show (FX)
 Continuum (Syfy)
 Falling Skies (TNT)
 Salem (WGN America)
 The Strain (FX)
 12 Monkeys (Syfy)
|-
! style="background:#EEDD82; width:50%" |Best Limited Run Television Series
! style="background:#EEDD82; width:50%" |Best Superhero Adaptation Television Series
|-
| valign="top" |
 Game of Thrones (HBO) Bates Motel (A&E)
 From Dusk till Dawn: The Series (El Rey Network)
 The Last Ship (TNT)
 The Librarians (TNT)
 Outlander (Starz)
| valign="top" |
 The Flash (The CW) Agent Carter (ABC)
 Agents of S.H.I.E.L.D. (ABC)
 Arrow (The CW)
 Constantine (NBC)
 Gotham (Fox)
|-
! colspan="2" style="background:#EEDD82; width:50%" |Best Youth-Oriented Television Series
|-
| colspan="2" valign="top" |
 The 100 (The CW) Doctor Who (BBC America)
 Pretty Little Liars (ABC Family)
 Supernatural (The CW)
 Teen Wolf (MTV)
 The Vampire Diaries (The CW)
|}

Acting

Home Entertainment
{| class=wikitable
|-
! style="background:#EEDD82; width:50%" | Best DVD or Blu-ray Release
! style="background:#EEDD82; width:50%" | Best DVD or Blu-ray Special Edition Release
|-
| valign="top" |
 Odd Thomas
 Beneath
 Blue Ruin
 Ragnarok
 White Bird in a Blizzard
 Wolf Creek 2
| valign="top" |
 Nightbreed: The Director's Cut
 Alexander: The Ultimate Cut The Hobbit: The Desolation of Smaug: Extended Edition Once Upon a Time in America: Extended Director's Cut
 Sorcerer The Texas Chain Saw Massacre: 40th Anniversary Collector's Edition|-
|-
! style="background:#EEDD82; width:50%" | Best DVD or Blu-ray Collection
! style="background:#EEDD82; width:50%" | Best DVD or Blu-ray TV Series
|-
| valign="top" |
 Halloween: The Complete Collection (Halloween (1978), Halloween II (1981), Halloween III: Season of the Witch, Halloween 4: The Return of Michael Myers, Halloween 5: The Revenge of Michael Myers, Halloween: The Curse of Michael Myers, Halloween H20: 20 Years Later, Halloween: Resurrection, Halloween (2007) and Halloween II (2009))
 The Exorcist: The Complete Anthology (The Exorcist, Exorcist II: The Heretic, The Exorcist III, Exorcist: The Beginning and Dominion: Prequel to the Exorcist)
 Stanley Kubrick: The Masterpiece Collection (Lolita, Dr. Strangelove, 2001: A Space Odyssey, A Clockwork Orange, Barry Lyndon, The Shining, Full Metal Jacket and Eyes Wide Shut) 
 Steven Spielberg Director's Collection (Duel, The Sugarland Express, Jaws, 1941, E.T. the Extra-Terrestrial, Always, Jurassic Park, The Lost World: Jurassic Park) 
 Toho Godzilla Collection (Godzilla, Godzilla Raids Again, Mothra vs. Godzilla, Ghidorah, the Three-Headed Monster, Invasion of Astro-Monster and Terror of Mechagodzilla)
 Universal Classic Monsters: Complete 30 Films Collection (Dracula, Frankenstein, The Mummy, The Invisible Man, Bride of Frankenstein, Werewolf of London, Dracula's Daughter, Son of Frankenstein, The Invisible Man Returns, The Invisible Woman, The Mummy's Hand, The Wolf Man, The Ghost of Frankenstein, The Mummy's Ghost, The Mummy's Tomb, Invisible Agent, Phantom of the Opera, Frankenstein Meets the Wolf Man, Son of Dracula, House of Frankenstein, The Mummy's Curse, The Invisible Man's Revenge, House of Dracula, She-Wolf of London, Abbott and Costello Meet Frankenstein, Abbott and Costello Meet the Invisible Man, Creature from the Black Lagoon, Abbott and Costello Meet the Mummy, Revenge of the Creature and The Creature Walks Among Us)
| valign="top" |
 Twin Peaks: The Entire Mystery (Twin Peaks: Season 1 & 2 and Twin Peaks: Fire Walk with Me)
 Batman: The Complete Television Series Hannibal: Season 2 Merlin: The Complete Series Spartacus: The Complete Series Star Trek: The Next Generation: Season 7 Wizards and Warriors: The Complete Series|}

Special Awards
Artist Showcase Award
 Noah Wyle

Breakthrough Performance Award
 Grant Gustin for The FlashSpecial Recognition Award
 ContinuumThe Dan Curtis Legacy Award
 Carlton Cuse

Multiple nominations and wins

Film

The following works received multiple nominations:

11 nominations: Captain America: The Winter Soldier, Interstellar9 nominations: Guardians of the Galaxy8 nominations: Dawn of the Planet of the Apes7 nominations: Edge of Tomorrow, The Hobbit: The Battle of the Five Armies5 nominations: Into the Woods, X-Men: Days of Future Past4 nominations: Birdman, The Grand Budapest Hotel, Maleficent3 nominations: The Babadook, Dracula Untold, Nightcrawler, Whiplash2 nominations: The Equalizer, Exodus: Gods and Kings, Godzilla, Gone Girl, The Guest,How to Train Your Dragon 2, The Hunger Games: Mockingjay – Part 1, Inherent Vice, UnbrokenThe following works received multiple wins:

6 wins: Interstellar4 wins: Guardians of the Galaxy2 wins: Dracula Untold, Gone Girl, The Hobbit: The Battle of the Five ArmiesTelevision

The following works received multiple nominations:

7 nominations: The Walking Dead6 nominations: Hannibal4 nominations: Continuum, Outlander3 nominations: Agent Carter, American Horror Story: Freak Show, Falling Skies, The Flash, Game of Thrones, The Librarians, The Strain2 nominations: The Americans, Bates Motel, Doctor Who, Gotham, Teen WolfThe following works received multiple wins:

3 wins: Hannibal, The Walking Dead2 wins: The Flash, Game of Thrones''

References

External links
 Official Saturn Awards website

Saturn Awards ceremonies
2015 film awards
2015 television awards
Saturn
Saturn